William Bogart may refer to:

William Henry Bogart (1810–1888), American politician and historian
William G. Bogart (1903–1977), American writer
William Bogart (1936–2005), stage name of Italian actor Guglielmo Spoletini who appeared in westerns (Death Knows No Time)

See also
William Bogert (1936–2020), American character actor
Bogart (disambiguation)